Khosraviyeh may refer to:
 Khosraviyeh, Khuzestan
 Khosraviyeh, North Khorasan